Sphingomonas paucimobilis is a strictly aerobic  Gram-negative bacterium that has a single polar flagellum with slow motility. The cell size is around 0.7 x 1.4 μm. It is usually found in soil. As with the other members of the genus, its biochemistry is remarkable in possession of ubiquinone 10 as its major respiratory quinone, and of glycosphingolipids instead of lipopolysaccharides in its cell envelope. It has been implicated in various types of clinical infections.

S. paucimobilis is able to degrade lignin-related biphenyl chemical compounds.

References

External links
Type strain of Sphingomonas paucimobilis at BacDive -  the Bacterial Diversity Metadatabase

paucimobilis
Bacteria described in 1977